Covenant Christian High School is a private Christian high school located in DeMotte, Indiana, United States.

About
Covenant Christian opened in DeMotte in 1999. The school started with one ninth grade class. Initially 14 first-year (freshmen) students attended. In the three subsequent years, another grade level was added, so that by the fall of 2002, the school had freshman through senior students. In the spring of 2003 the first class graduated with 15 students, along with two exchange students who received recognition for their time at Covenant.
Current enrollment now stands at about 110.

Educational philosophy
The purpose of Covenant Christian is to educate students in such a way that each student will become a useful and creative citizen of Christ's Kingdom and of the student's community. Therefore, education includes a variety of academic, physical, spiritual, and service components.

Academics

 Each year, students take the ECA test as required by the State of Indiana. Test scores are consistently high.
 All Indiana schools are assigned a letter grade (A thru F) based on student performance on standardized tests and their academic growth rate from year to year. CCHS has earned the rating "B" each academic year. 45 course offerings
 90% of students continue their education after high school, with over 75% attending college or university
 ACT Composite score - 24.0% since 1999; 23.9% in 2013

Student development

 A key component of student development takes place during "Service Week" each year. Students are given the opportunity to learn about their future life of service in God's Kingdom through various service opportunities. 
 Each student is required to complete an additional 12 hours of community service during the school year.

See also

 List of high schools in Indiana

References

External links
 Covenant Christian High School

1999 establishments in Indiana
Christian schools in Indiana
Educational institutions established in 1999
High schools in Indiana
Schools in Jasper County, Indiana